Sir Samuel George Bonham, 1st Baronet  (Chinese Translated Name 般咸, 文咸 or 文翰) (7 September 1803 – 8 October 1863) was a British colonial governor, who became the 4th Governor of the Straits Settlements and the 3rd Governor of Hong Kong.

Early life
Samuel George Bonham was born in Faversham, Kent on 7 September 1803. He was the son of Captain George Bonham, of the maritime service of the East India Company. His mother, Isabella, the daughter of Robert Woodgate, was his father's second wife. He had one sister, also called Isabella, who married the Belgian count Ferdinand d'Oultremont.
His father drowned in 1810.

When he was fifteen, he started working for the East India Company in Bencoolen, Sumatra.

Governor of Straits Settlements
Bonham became deputy to the Governor of the Straits Settlements, Kenneth Murchison, in 1833. However, as Murchison was away from Southeast Asia for much of his governorship, Bonham was in effect responsible for the administration of the Straits Settlements. He took over from Murchison as Governor on 18 November 1836, a post he held until January 1843. He first governed from Penang, but later made Singapore the permanent residence of the Governor. During his governorship, Singapore grew in commercial importance as well as strategic significance as it supplied provisions for warships on their way to the Opium War in China. He was involved in the partial abolition of bond slavery, and provided a ship to combat piracy in the region. In an attempt to reduce the cost of administration, he reduced the number of senior officials from 19 to 8.

Governor of Hong Kong
After a period of service with the East India Company, Bonham was appointed Governor of Hong Kong and plenipotentiary and superintendent of trade in China on 21 March 1848. During his tenure Bonham cut government spendings to balance the budget and also stimulated the Real Estate market in order to increase government income. His method of increasing government income eventually became the major source of income for the Hong Kong government a century later.

Bonham was appointed a Companion of the Order of the Bath (CB) in April 1848.

Bonham was known for his calm demeanour and gentle nature. It was due to these qualities that he gained the trust of the British Government and the good relationship of many Hong Kong people.

In 1850, upon his request to the Viceroy, a successful expedition was conducted against the pirates in the neighbourhood of Hong Kong, and Bonham attempted to open direct communication with the central government at Peking, and in furtherance of this object sent Mr Medhurst to the Peiho with a despatch, but the effort proved fruitless.

Bonham retired from the position of Governor in Hong Kong in April 1854 and returned to England.

Baronet of Malmesbury
In November 1850 Bonham was promoted to Knight Commander of the Order of the Bath (KCB) as a reward for his services in China, and following his return to England a Baronetcy was conferred upon him on 27 November 1852.

Personal life
In 1846, Bonham married Ellen Emelia Barnard, the eldest daughter of Thomas Barnard. They had one son, George Francis Bonham (28 August 1847 – 31 July 1927), who succeeded to the Baronetcy. Bonham's wife died in 1859 and he survived her until 8 October 1863, dying aged 60, of undisclosed causes. He was buried at Kensal Green Cemetery, London.

Legacy
Bonham Road and Bonham Strand on Hong Kong Island were also named after him.

References

Attribution

Bibliography

External links

1803 births
1863 deaths
Baronets in the Baronetage of the United Kingdom
Governors of Penang
Governors of the Straits Settlements
Governors of Hong Kong
History of Penang
Knights Commander of the Order of the Bath
People from Faversham
Burials at Kensal Green Cemetery
19th-century Hong Kong people
Chief Secretaries of Singapore
Administrators in British Singapore